The Delaware United States House election for 1800 was held on October 7, 1800. The incumbent Representative and House Minority Leader James A. Bayard Sr. won reelection and defeated the former Representative John Patten, who would die later that year.

Results

References

Delaware
1800
1800 Delaware elections